Elvira Lacy Duarte Cardoso (b. 15 September 1937 – d. 27 December 2015) was a Uruguayan visual artist.

Biography
Elvira Lacy Duarte Cardoso was born in Mataojo, Salto Department in Uruguay on 15 September 1937 near the border with Brazil, a rural area that would come to characterize her artwork.

In 1962, this family moved to San Carlos in Maldonado Department where Duarte began teaching secondary education drawing classes and began to learn weaving. In 1975, the family fled from the civic-military dictatorship of Uruguay to Porto Alegre, Brazil, and left the Duarte Tapices tapestry workshop to local weavers. Aldo died in 1981, and Duarte returned Montevideo shortly thereafter and resumed painting. In 1986, she was selected to represent Uruguay at the 1987 Havana Biennial and her art would exhibit in the United States and Europe.

In 1990, Duarte started a series of artwork that included paintings and objects such as wood carvings, bread crumbs, ragged bedspreads, the condition of women and their children in the countryside and people performing rural tasks (Farmers, hunters, trappers, etc.). This project, entitled Memoria y ritos en el espacio de la mujer campesina, referred to the differences Duarte observed between urban and rural Uruguayans. This series would exhibit at the Juan Manuel Blanes Museum in the Prado neighborhood of Montevideo, Rio Grande do Sul Museum of Art in Porto Alegre, Linda Moore Gallery in San Diego, California and at the biennials in Paris and Cuenca among other examples of Uruguayan art.

In 2011, Duarte joined the National Visual Arts Commission of the Uruguayan Ministry of Education and Culture.

Lacy Duarte died in Montevideo, aged 78.

Awards
In 2002, the Central Bank of Uruguay awarded Duarte the Figari Award, named in honor of Uruguayan painter Pedro Figari, in recognition of her career of art.

In 2005, she represented Uruaguay at the Venice Biennale with an installation that "reflected the neat poverty" of the Uruguayan countryside.

Citations

External links
 A gallery of Lacy Duarte's paintings

1937 births
2015 deaths
People from Salto Department
20th-century Uruguayan painters
Uruguayan women painters
20th-century Uruguayan women artists